Following is a list of physicists who are notable for their achievements.

A 

Aryabhatta – India (476-550C.E) 
Jules Aarons – United States (1921–2016)
Ernst Karl Abbe – Germany (1840–1905)
Derek Abbott – Australia (born 1960)
Hasan Abdullayev – Azerbaijan Democratic Republic, Soviet Union, Azerbaijan (1918–1993)
Alexei Alexeyevich Abrikosov – Soviet Union, Russia (1928–2017) Nobel laureate
Robert Adler – United States (1913–2007)
Stephen L. Adler – United States (born 1939)
Franz Aepinus – Rostock (1724–1802)
Mina Aganagic -- Albania, United States
David Z Albert – United States (born 1954)
Felicie Albert – France, United States
Miguel Alcubierre – Mexico (born 1964)
Zhores Ivanovich Alferov – Russia (1930–2019) Nobel laureate
Hannes Olof Gösta Alfvén – Sweden (1908–1995) Nobel laureate
Alhazen – Basra, Iraq (965–1040)
Artem Alikhanian – Armenia (1908–1978)
Abram Alikhanov – Russia (1904–1970)
John E. Allen – United Kingdom (born 1928)
William Allis – United States (1901–1999)
Samuel King Allison – United States (1900–1965)
Yakov Lvovich Alpert – Russia, United States (1911–2010)
Ralph Asher Alpher – United States (1921–2007)
Semen Altshuler – Vitebsk (1911–1983)
Abdulla Majed-Syria(2007)
Luis Walter Alvarez – United States (1911–1988) Nobel laureate
Viktor Ambartsumian – Soviet Union, Armenia (1908–1996)
André-Marie Ampère – France (1775–1836)
Anja Cetti Andersen – Denmark (born 1965)
Hans Henrik Andersen – Denmark (1937–2012)
Philip Warren Anderson – United States (1923–2020) Nobel laureate
Carl David Anderson – United States (1905–1991) Nobel laureate
Herbert L. Anderson – United States (1914–1988)
Elephter Andronikashvili – Georgia (1910–1989)
Anders Jonas Ångström – Sweden (1814–1874)
Alexander Animalu, Nigeria (born 1938)
Edward Victor Appleton – U.K. (1892–1965) Nobel laureate
François Arago – France (1786–1853)
Archimedes – Syracuse, Greece (ca. 287–212 BC)
Manfred von Ardenne – Germany (1907–1997)
Aristarchus of Samos – Samos, Greece (310–ca. 230 BC)
Aristotle – Athens, Greece (384–322 BC)
Nima Arkani-Hamed – United States (born 1972)
Lev Artsimovich – Moscow (1909–1973)
Aryabhata – Pataliputra, India (476–550)
Neil Ashby – United States (born 1934)
Maha Ashour-Abdalla – Egypt, United States (1943–2016)
Gurgen Askaryan – Soviet Union (1928–1997)
Alain Aspect – France (born 1947)
Marcel Audiffren – France
Avicenna – Persia (980–1037)
Amedeo Avogadro – Italy (1776–1856)
David Awschalom – United States (born 1956)
APJ Abdul Kalam – India

B 

Al-Biruni – İran (born 973)
Abu sahl Al-Quhi – İran (born 940)
Xiaoyi Bao – Canada
Mani Lal Bhaumik – United States (born 1931)
Tom Baehr-Jones – United States (born 1980)
Gilbert Ronald Bainbridge – U.K. (1925–2003)
Cornelis Bakker – Netherlands (1904–1960)
Aiyalam Parameswaran Balachandran – India (born 1938)
V Balakrishnan – India (born 1943)
Milla Baldo-Ceolin – Italy (1924–2011)
Johann Jakob Balmer – Switzerland (1825–1898)
Tom Banks – United States (born 1949)
Riccardo Barbieri – Italy (born 1944)
Marcia Barbosa – Brazil (born 1960)
John Bardeen – United States (1908–1991) double Nobel laureate
William A. Bardeen – United States (born 1941)
Charles Glover Barkla – U.K. (1877–1944) Nobel laureate
Amanda Barnard – Australia (born 1971)
Boyd Bartlett – United States (1897–1965)
Asım Orhan Barut – Malatya, Turkey (1926–1994)
Heinz Barwich – Germany (1911–1966)
Nikolay Basov – Russia (1922–2001) Nobel laureate
Laura Maria Caterina Bassi – Italy (1711–1778)
Zoltán Lajos Bay – Hungary (1900–1992)
Karl Bechert – Germany (1901–1981)
Henri Becquerel – France (1852–1908) Nobel laureate
Johannes Georg Bednorz – Germany (born 1950) Nobel laureate
Isaac Beeckman – Netherlands (1588–1637)
Alexander Graham Bell – Scotland, Canada, U.S.A. (1847–1922)
John Stewart Bell – U.K. (1928–1990)
Jocelyn Bell Burnell – Northern Ireland, U.K. (born 1943)
Carl M. Bender – United States (born 1943)
Abraham Bennet – England (1749–1799)
Daniel Bernoulli – Switzerland (1700–1782)
Hans Bethe – Germany, United States (1906–2005) Nobel laureate
Homi J. Bhabha – India (1909–1966)
Lars Bildsten – United States (1964)
James Binney – England (born 1950)
Gerd Binnig – Germany (born 1947) Nobel laureate
Jean-Baptiste Biot – France (1774–1862)
Raymond T. Birge – United States (1887–1980)
Abū Rayhān al-Bīrūnī – Persia (973–1048)
Vilhelm Bjerknes – Norway (1862–1951)
James Bjorken – United States (born 1934)
Patrick Blackett – U.K. (1897–1974) Nobel laureate
Felix Bloch – Switzerland (1905–1983) Nobel laureate
Nicolaas Bloembergen – Netherlands, United States (1920–2017) Nobel laureate
Walter Boas – Germany, Australia (1904–1982)
Céline Bœhm – France (born 1974)
Nikolay Bogolyubov – Soviet Union, Russia (1909–1992)
David Bohm – United States (1917–1992)
Aage Bohr – Denmark (1922–2009) Nobel laureate
Niels Bohr – Denmark (1885–1962) Nobel laureate
Martin Bojowald – Germany (born 1973)
Ludwig Boltzmann – Austria (1844–1906)
Eugene T. Booth – United States (1912–2004)
Max Born – Germany, U.K. (1882–1970) Nobel laureate
Rudjer Josip Boscovich – Croatia (1711–1787)
Jagadish Chandra Bose – India (1858–1937)
Margrete Heiberg Bose – Denmark (1866–1952)
Satyendra Nath Bose – India (1894–1974)
Johannes Bosscha – Netherlands (1831–1911)
Walther Bothe – Germany (1891–1957) Nobel laureate
Edward Bouchet – United States (1852–1918)
Mustapha Ishak Boushaki – Algeria (1967–)
Mark Bowick – United States (born 1957)
Robert Boyle – Ireland, England (1627–1691)
Willard S. Boyle – Canada, United States (1924–2011) Nobel laureate
William Henry Bragg – U.K. (1862–1942) Nobel laureate
William Lawrence Bragg – U.K., Australia (1890–1971) Nobel laureate
Tycho Brahe – Denmark (1546–1601)
Howard Brandt – United States (1939–2014)
Walter Houser Brattain – United States (1902–1987) Nobel laureate
Karl Ferdinand Braun – Germany (1850–1918) Nobel laureate
David Brewster – U.K. (1781–1868)
Percy Williams Bridgman – United States (1882–1961) Nobel laureate
Léon Nicolas Brillouin – France (1889–1969)
Marcel Brillouin – France (1854–1948)
Bertram Brockhouse – Canada (1918–2003) Nobel laureate
Louis-Victor de Broglie – France (1892–1987) Nobel laureate
William Fuller Brown, Jr. – United States (1904–1983)
Ernst Brüche – Germany (1900–1985)
Hermann Brück – Germany (1905–2000)
Ari Brynjolfsson – Iceland (1927–2013)
Hans Buchdahl – Germany, Australia (1918–2010)
Gersh Budker – Soviet Union (1918–1977)
Silke Bühler-Paschen – Austria (born 1967)
Johannes Martinus Burgers – Netherlands (1895–1981)
Friedrich Burmeister – Germany (1890–1969)
Bimla Buti – India (born 1933)
Christophorus Buys Ballot – Netherlands (1817–1890)

C 
Nicola Cabibbo – Italy (1935–2010)
Nicolás Cabrera – Spain (1913–1989)
Orion Ciftja – United States
Curtis Callan – United States (born 1942)
Annie Jump Cannon – United States (1863–1941)
Fritjof Capra – Austria, United States (born 1939)
Marcela Carena – Argentina (born 1962)
Ricardo Carezani – Argentina, United States (1921–2016)
Nicolas Léonard Sadi Carnot – France (1796–1832)
David Carroll – United States (born 1963)
Brandon Carter – Australia (born 1942)
Hendrik Casimir – Netherlands (1909–2000)
Henry Cavendish – U.K. (1731–1810)
James Chadwick – U.K. (1891–1974) Nobel laureate
Owen Chamberlain – United States (1920–2006) Nobel laureate
Moses H. W. Chan – Hong Kong (born 1946)
Subrahmanyan Chandrasekhar – India, United States (1910–1995) Nobel laureate
Georges Charpak – France (1924–2010) Nobel laureate
Émilie du Châtelet – France (1706–1749)
Swapan Chattopadhyay – India (born 1951)
Pavel Alekseyevich Cherenkov – Imperial Russia, Soviet Union (1904–1990) Nobel laureate
Maxim Chernodub – Russia, France (born 1973)
Geoffrey Chew – United States (1924–2019)
Boris Chirikov – Soviet Union, Russia (1928–2008)
Juansher Chkareuli – Georgia (born 1940)
Ernst Chladni – Germany (1756–1827)
Nicholas Christofilos – Greece (1916-1972)
Steven Chu – United States (born 1948) Nobel laureate
Giovanni Ciccotti – Italy (born 1943)
Benoît Clapeyron – France (1799–1864)
George W. Clark – United States
John Clauser – United States (born 1942) Nobel laureate
Rudolf Clausius – Germany (1822–1888)
Gerald B. Cleaver – United States
Richard Clegg – United Kingdom
Gari Clifford - British-American physicist, biomedical engineer, academic, researcher
John Cockcroft – United Kingdom (1897–1967) Nobel laureate
Claude Cohen-Tannoudji – France (born 1933) Nobel laureate
Arthur Compton – United States (1892–1962) Nobel laureate
Karl Compton – United States (1887–1954)
Edward Condon – United States (1902–1974)
Leon Cooper – United States (born 1930) Nobel laureate
Alejandro Corichi – Mexico (born 1967)
Gaspard-Gustave Coriolis – France (1792–1843)
Allan McLeod Cormack – South Africa, United States (1924–1998)
Eric Allin Cornell – United States (born 1961) Nobel laureate
Marie Alfred Cornu – France (1841–1902)
Charles-Augustin de Coulomb – France (1736–1806)
Ernest Courant – United States (1920–2020)
Brian Cox – U.K. (born 1968)
Charles Critchfield – United States (1910–1994)
James Cronin – United States (1931–2016) Nobel laureate
Sir William Crookes – U.K. (1832–1919)
Paul Crowell – United States
Marie Curie – Poland, France (1867–1934) twice Nobel laureate
Pierre Curie – France (1859–1906) Nobel laureate
Predrag Cvitanović – Croatia (born 1946)

D 
Jean le Rond d'Alembert – France (1717–1783)
Gustaf Dalén – Sweden (1869–1937) Nobel laureate
Jean Dalibard – France (born 1958)
Richard Dalitz – U.K., United States (1925–2006)
John Dalton – U.K. (1766–1844)
Sanja Damjanović – Montenegro (born 1972)
Ranjan Roy Daniel – India (1923–2005)
Charles Galton Darwin – U.K. (1887–1962)
Ashok Das – India, United States (born 1953)
James C. Davenport – United States (born 1938)
Paul Davies – Australia (born 1946)
Raymond Davis, Jr. – United States (1914–2006) Nobel laureate
Clinton Davisson – United States (1881–1958) Nobel laureate
Peter Debije – Netherlands (1884–1966)
Hans Georg Dehmelt – Germany, United States (1922–2017) Nobel laureate
Max Delbrück – Germany, United States (1906–1981)
Democritus – Abdera (ca. 460–360 BC)
David M. Dennison – United States (1900–1976)
Beryl May Dent – U.K. (1900–1977)
David Deutsch – Israel, U.K. (born 1953)
René Descartes – France (1596–1650) 
James Dewar – U.K. (1842–1923)
Scott Diddams – United States 
Ulrike Diebold – Austria (born 1961)
Robbert Dijkgraaf – Netherlands (born 1960)
Viktor Dilman – Russia (born 1926)
Savas Dimopoulos – United States (born 1952)
Paul Dirac – Switzerland, U.K. (1902–1984) Nobel laureate
Revaz Dogonadze – Soviet Union, Georgia (1931–1985)
Louise Dolan -- United States (born 1950)
Amos Dolbear – United States (1837–1910)
Robert Döpel – Germany (1895–1982)
Christian Doppler – Austria (1803–1853)
Henk Dorgelo – Netherlands (1894–1961)
Friedrich Ernst Dorn – Germany (1848–1916)
Michael R. Douglas – United States (born 1961)
Jonathan Dowling – United States (1955–2020)
Claudia Draxl – Germany (born 1959)
Sidney Drell – United States (1926–2016)
Mildred Dresselhaus – United States (1930–2017)
Paul Drude – Germany (1863–1906)
F. J. Duarte – United States (born 1954)
Émilie du Châtelet – France (1706–1749)
Pierre Louis Dulong – France (1785–1838)
Janette Dunlop – Scotland (1891–1971) 
Samuel T. Durrance – United States (born 1943)
Freeman Dyson – U.K., United States (1923–2020) Wolf laureate
Arthur Jeffrey Dempster – Canada (1886–1950)

E 
Joseph H. Eberly – United States (born 1935)
William Eccles – U.K. (1875–1966)
Carl Eckart – United States (1902–1973)
Arthur Stanley Eddington – U.K. (1882–1944)
Thomas Edison- U.S. Invented the lightbulb.
Paul Ehrenfest – Austria-Hungary, Netherlands (1880–1933)
Felix Ehrenhaft – Austria-Hungary, United States (1879–1952)
Manfred Eigen – Germany (1927–2019)
Albert Einstein – Germany, Italy, Switzerland, United States (1879–1955) Nobel laureate
Laura Eisenstein – (1942–1985) professor of physics at University of Illinois 
Terence James Elkins – Australia, United States (born 1936)
John Ellis – U.K. (born 1946)
Paul John Ellis – U.K., United States (1941–2005)
Richard Keith Ellis – U.K., United States (born 1949)
Arpad Elo – Hungary (1903–1992)
François Englert – Belgium (born 1932) Nobel laureate
David Enskog – Sweden (1884–1947)
Loránd Eötvös – Austria-Hungary (1848–1919)
Frederick J. Ernst – United States (born 1933)
Leo Esaki – Japan (born 1925) Nobel laureate
Ernest Esclangon – France (1876–1954)
Louis Essen – U.K. (1908–1997)
Leonhard Euler – Switzerland (1707–1783)
Denis Evans – Australia (born 1951)
Paul Peter Ewald – Germany, United States (1888–1985)
James Alfred Ewing – U.K. (1855–1935)
Franz S. Exner – Austria (1849–1926)

F 
Ludvig Faddeev – Russia (1934–2017)
Daniel Gabriel Fahrenheit – Prussia (1686–1736)
Kazimierz Fajans – Poland, United States (1887–1975)
James E. Faller – United States 
Michael Faraday – U.K. (1791–1867)
Eugene Feenberg – United States (1906–1977)
Mitchell Feigenbaum – United States (1944–2019)
Gerald Feinberg – United States (1933–1992)
Enrico Fermi – Italy (1901–1954) Nobel laureate
Albert Fert – France (born 1938) Nobel laureate
Herman Feshbach – United States (1917–2000)
Richard Feynman – United States (1918–1988) Nobel laureate
Wolfgang Finkelnburg – Germany (1905–1967)
David Finkelstein – United States (1929–2016)
Johannes Fischer – Germany (born 1887)
Willy Fischler  – Belgium (born 1949)
Val Logsdon Fitch – United States (1923–2015) Nobel laureate
George Francis FitzGerald – Ireland (1851–1901)
Hippolyte Fizeau – France (1819–1896)
Georgy Flyorov – Rostov-on-Don (1913–1990)
Vladimir Fock – Imperial Russia, Soviet Union (1898–1974)
Adriaan Fokker – Netherlands (1887–1972)
Arthur Foley – America (1867–1945)
James David Forbes – U.K. (1809–1868)
Jeff Forshaw – U.K. (born 1968) 
Léon Foucault – France (1819–1868)
Joseph Fourier – France (1768–1830)
Ralph H. Fowler – U.K. (1889–1944)
William Alfred Fowler – United States (1911–1995) Nobel laureate
James Franck – Germany, United States (1882–1964) Nobel laureate
Ilya Frank – Soviet Union (1908–1990) Nobel laureate
Benjamin Franklin – British America, United States (1706–1790)
Rosalind Franklin – U.K. (1920–1958)
Walter Franz – Germany (1911–1992)
Joseph von Fraunhofer – Germany (1787–1826)
Steven Frautschi – United States (born 1933)
Joan Maie Freeman – Australia (1918–1998)
Phyllis S. Freier – United States (1921–1992))
Yakov Frenkel – Imperial Russia, Soviet Union (1894–1952)
Augustin-Jean Fresnel – France (1788–1827)
Peter Freund – United States (1936–2018)
Daniel Friedan – United States (born 1948)
B. Roy Frieden – United States (born 1936)
Alexander Friedman – Imperial Russia, Soviet Union (1888–1925)
Jerome Isaac Friedman – United States (born 1930) Nobel laureate
Otto Frisch – Austria, U.K. (1904–1979)
Erwin Fues – Germany (1893–1970)
Harald Fuchs – Germany (born 1951)

G 

Dennis Gabor – Hungary (1900–1979) Nobel laureate
Mary K. Gaillard – France, United States (born 1939)
Galileo Galilei – Italy (1564–1642)
Luigi Galvani – Italy (1737–1798)
George Gamow – Russia, United States (1904–1968)
Sylvester James Gates – United States (born 1950)
Carl Friedrich Gauss – Germany (1777–1855)
Pamela L. Gay – United States (born 1973)
Joseph Louis Gay-Lussac – France (1778–1850)
Hans Geiger – Germany (1882–1945)
Andre Geim – Russian/British (born 1958) Nobel laureate
Murray Gell-Mann – United States (1929–2019) Nobel laureate
Pierre-Gilles de Gennes – France (1932–2007) Nobel laureate
Howard Georgi – United States (born 1947)
Walter Gerlach – Germany (1889–1979)
Christian Gerthsen – Denmark, Germany (1894–1956)
Ezra Getzler – Australia (born 1962)
Andrea M. Ghez – United States (born 1955) Nobel laureate
Riccardo Giacconi – Italy, United States (1931–2018) Nobel laureate
Ivar Giaever – Norway, United States (born 1929) Nobel laureate
Josiah Willard Gibbs – United States (1839–1903)
Valerie Gibson – U.K. (born 19??)
William Gilbert – England (1544–1603)
Piara Singh Gill – India (1911–2002)
Naomi Ginsberg – United States (born 1979)
Vitaly Lazarevich Ginzburg – Soviet Union, Russia (1916–2009) Nobel laureate
Marvin D. Girardeau – United States (1930–2015)
Marissa Giustina - United States (born 19??)
Donald Arthur Glaser – United States (1926–2013) Nobel laureate
Sheldon Glashow – United States (born 1932) Nobel laureate
G. N. Glasoe – United States (1902–1987)
Roy Jay Glauber – United States (1925–2018) Nobel laureate
James Glimm – United States (born 1934)
Karl Glitscher – Germany (1886–1945)
Peter Goddard – U.K. (born 1945)
Maria Goeppert-Mayer – Germany, United States (1906–1972) Nobel laureate
Gerald Goertzel – United States (1920–2002)
Marvin Leonard Goldberger – United States (1922–2014)
Maurice Goldhaber – Austria, United States (1911–2011)
Jeffrey Goldstone – U.K., United States (born 1933)
Sixto González – Puerto Rico, United States (born 1965)
Ravi Gomatam – India (born 1950)
Lev Gor'kov – United States (1929–2016)
Samuel Goudsmit – Netherlands, United States (1902–1978)
Leo Graetz – Germany (1856–1941)
Willem 's Gravesande – Netherlands (1688–1742)
Michael Green (physicist) – Britain (born 1946)
Daniel Greenberger – United States (born 1932)
Brian Greene – United States (born 1963)
John Gribbin – U.K. (born 1946)
Vladimir Gribov – Russia (1930–1997)
David J. Griffiths – United States (born 1942)
David Gross – United States (born 1941) Nobel laureate
Frederick Grover – United States (1876–1973)
Peter Grünberg – Germany (1939–2018) Nobel laureate
Charles Édouard Guillaume – Switzerland (1861–1931) Nobel laureate
Ayyub Guliyev – Azerbaijan (born 1954)
Feza Gürsey – Turkey (1921–1992)
Alan Guth – United States (born 1947)
Martin Gutzwiller – Switzerland (1925–2014)

H 
Rudolf Haag – Germany (1922–2016)
Wander Johannes de Haas – Netherlands (1878–1960)
Alain Haché – Canada (born 1970)
Carl Richard Hagen – United States (born 1937)
Otto Hahn – Germany (1879–1968)
Edwin Hall – United States (1855–1938)
John Lewis Hall – United States (born 1934) Nobel laureate
Alexander Hamilton – UK, Australia (born 1967)
William Rowan Hamilton – Ireland (1805–1865)
Theodor Wolfgang Hänsch – Germany (born 1941) Nobel laureate
Peter Andreas Hansen – Denmark (1795–1874)
W.W. Hansen – United States (1909–1949)
Serge Haroche – France (born 1944) Nobel laureate
Paul Harteck – Germany (1902–1985)
John G. Hartnett – Australia (born 1952)
Douglas Hartree – U.K. (1897–1958)
Friedrich Hasenöhrl – Austria, Hungary (1874–1915)
Lene Vestergaard Hau – Vejle, Denmark (born 1959)
Stephen Hawking – U.K. (1942–2018) Wolf laureate
Ibn al-Haytham – Iraq (965–1039)
Evans Hayward – United States (1922–2020)
Oliver Heaviside – U.K. (1850–1925)
Werner Heisenberg – Germany (1901–1976) Nobel laureate
Walter Heitler – Germany, Ireland (1904–1981)
Hermann von Helmholtz – Germany (1821–1894)
Charles H. Henry – United States (1937–2016)
Joseph Henry – United States (1797–1878)
John Herapath – U.K. (1790–1868)
Carl Hermann – Germany (1898–1961)
Gustav Ludwig Hertz – Germany (1887–1975) Nobel laureate
Heinrich Rudolf Hertz – Germany (1857–1894)
Karl Herzfeld – Austria, United States (1892–1978)
Victor Francis Hess – Austria, United States (1883–1964) Nobel laureate
Mahmoud Hessaby – Iran (1903–1992)
Antony Hewish – U.K. (1924–2021) Nobel laureate
Paul G. Hewitt – United States (born 1931)
Peter Higgs – U.K. (born 1929) Nobel laureate
George William Hill – United States (1838–1914)
Gustave-Adolphe Hirn – France (1815–1890)
Carol Hirschmugl -  United States, professor of physics, laboratory director
Dorothy Crowfoot Hodgkin – England (1910–1994)
Robert Hofstadter – United States (1915–1990) Nobel laureate
Helmut Hönl – Germany (1903–1981)
Pervez Hoodbhoy – Pakistan (born 1950)
Gerardus 't Hooft – Netherlands (born 1946) Nobel laureate
Robert Hooke – England (1635–1703)
John Hopkinson – United Kingdom (1849–1898)
Johann Baptiste Horvath – Slovakia (1732–1799)
William V. Houston – United States (1900–1968)
Charlotte (née Riefenstahl) Houtermans – Germany (1899–1993)
Fritz Houtermans – Netherlands, Germany, Austria (1903–1966)
Archibald Howie – U.K. (born 1934)
Fred Hoyle – U.K. (1915–2001)
Veronika Hubeny -- United States
John Hubbard – U.K. (1931–1980)
John H. Hubbell – United States (1925–2007)
Edwin Powell Hubble – United States (1889–1953)
Russell Alan Hulse – United States (born 1950) Nobel laureate
Friedrich Hund – Germany (1896–1997)
Tahir Hussain – Pakistan (1923–2010)
Andrew D. Huxley – U.K. (born 1966)
Christiaan Huygens – Netherlands (1629–1695)

I 
Arthur Iberall – United States (1918–2002)
Sumio Iijima – Japan (born 1939)
John Iliopoulos – Greece (born 1940)
Ataç İmamoğlu – Turkey, United States (born 1962)
Elmer Imes – United States (1883–1941)
Abram Ioffe – Russia (1880–1960)
Nathan Isgur – United States, Canada (1947–2001)
Ernst Ising – Germany (1900–1998)
Jamal Nazrul Islam – Bangladesh (1939–2013)
Werner Israel – Canada (born 1931)

J 
Roman Jackiw – Poland, United States (born 1939)
Shirley Ann Jackson – United States (born 1946)
Boris Jacobi – Germany, Russia (1801–1874)
Gregory Jaczko – United States (born 1970)
Chennupati Jagadish – India, Australia (born 1957)
Jainendra Jain – India (born 1960)
Ratko Janev – North Macedonia (1939–2019)
Andreas Jaszlinszky – Hungary (1715–1783)
Ali Javan – Iran (1928–2016)
Edwin Jaynes – United States (1922–1998)
 Antal István Jákli – Hungary (born 1958)
Sir James Jeans – UK (1877–1946)
Johannes Hans Daniel Jensen – Germany (1907–1973) Nobel laureate
Deborah S. Jin – United States (born 1968)
Anthony M. Johnson – United States (born 1954)
Irène Joliot-Curie – France (1897–1956)
Lorella Jones – United States (1943–1995)
Pascual Jordan – Germany (1902–1980)
Vania Jordanova - United States, physicist, space weather and geomagnetic storms

Brian David Josephson – UK (born 1940) Nobel laureate
James Prescott Joule – UK (1818–1889)
Adolfas Jucys – Lithuania (1904–1974)
Chang Kee Jung – South Korea, United States

K
Menas Kafatos – Greece, United States (born 1945)
Takaaki Kajita – Japan (born 1959) Nobel laureate
Michio Kaku – United States (born 1947)
Theodor Kaluza – Germany (1885–1954)
Heike Kamerlingh Onnes – Netherlands (1853–1926) Nobel laureate
William R. Kanne – United States
Charles K. Kao – China, Hong Kong, U.K., United States (1933–2018) Nobel laureate
Pyotr Kapitsa – Russian Empire, Soviet Union (1894–1984) Nobel laureate
Theodore von Kármán – Hungary, United States (1881–1963) aeronautical engineer
Alfred Kastler – France (1902–1984) Nobel laureate
Amrom Harry Katz – United States (1915–1997)
Moshe Kaveh – Israel (born 1943) President of Bar-Ilan University
Predhiman Krishan Kaw – India (1948–2017)
Heinrich Kayser – Germany (1853–1940)
Willem Hendrik Keesom – Netherlands (1876–1956)
Edwin C. Kemble – United States (1889–1984)
Henry Way Kendall – United States (1926–1999) Nobel laureate
Johannes Kepler – Germany (1571–1630)
John Kerr – Scotland (1824–1907)
Wolfgang Ketterle – Germany (born 1957) Nobel laureate
Isaak Markovich Khalatnikov – Soviet Union (1919–2021)
Jim Al-Khalili – UK (born 1962)
Abdul Qadeer Khan – Pakistan (1936–2021)
Yulii Borisovich Khariton – Soviet Union, Russia (1904–1996)
Erhard Kietz – Germany, United States (1909–1982)
Jack Kilby – United States (1923–2005) electronics engineer, Nobel laureate
Toichiro Kinoshita – Japan, United States (born 1925)
Gustav Kirchhoff – Germany (1824–1887)
Oskar Klein – Sweden (1894–1977)
Hagen Kleinert – Germany (born 1941)
Klaus von Klitzing – Germany (born 1943) Nobel laureate
Jens Martin Knudsen – Denmark (1930–2005)
Martin Knudsen – Denmark (1871–1949)
Makoto Kobayashi – Japan (born 1944) Nobel laureate
Arthur Korn – Germany (1870–1945)
Masatoshi Koshiba – Japan (1926–2020) Nobel laureate
Matthew Koss – United States (born 1961)
Walther Kossel – Germany (1888–1956)
Ashutosh Kotwal – United States (born 1965)
Lew Kowarski – France (1907–1979)
Hendrik Kramers – Netherlands (1894–1952)
Serguei Krasnikov – Russia (born 1961)
Adolf Kratzer – Germany (1893–1983)
Lawrence M. Krauss – United States (born 1954)
Herbert Kroemer – Germany (born 1928) Nobel laureate
August Krönig – Germany (1822–1879)
Ralph Kronig – Germany, United States (1904–1995)
Nikolay Sergeevich Krylov – Soviet Union (1917–1947)
Ryogo Kubo – Japan (1920–1995)
Daya Shankar Kulshreshtha – India (born 1951) 
Igor Vasilyevich Kurchatov – Soviet Union (1903–1960)
Behram Kursunoglu – Turkey (1922–2003)
Polykarp Kusch – Germany (1911–1993) Nobel laureate

L 
James W. LaBelle – United States
Joseph-Louis Lagrange – France (1736–1813)
Willis Lamb – United States (1913–2008) Nobel laureate
Lev Davidovich Landau – Imperial Russia, Soviet Union (1908–1968) Nobel laureate
Rolf Landauer – United States (1927–1999)
Grigory Landsberg – Vologda (1890–1957)
Kenneth Lane – United States
Paul Langevin – France (1872–1946)
Irving Langmuir – United States (1881–1957)
Pierre-Simon Laplace – France (1749–1827)
Joseph Larmor – U.K. (1857–1942)
Cesar Lattes – Brazil (1924–2005)
Max von Laue – Germany (1879–1960) Nobel laureate
Robert Betts Laughlin – United States (born 1950) Nobel laureate
Mikhail Lavrentyev – Kazan (1900–1980)
Melvin Lax – United States (1922–2002)
Ernest Lawrence – United States (1901–1958) Nobel laureate
TH Laby – Australia (1880–1946)
Pyotr Nikolaevich Lebedev – Imperial Russia (1866–1912)
Leon Max Lederman – United States (1922–2018) Nobel laureate
Benjamin Lee – Korea, United States (1935–1977)
David Lee – United States (born 1931) Nobel laureate
Tsung-Dao Lee – China, United States (born 1926) Nobel laureate
Anthony James Leggett – U.K., United States (born 1938) Nobel laureate
Gottfried Wilhelm Leibniz – Germany (1646–1716)
Robert B. Leighton – United States (1919–1997)
Georges Lemaître – Belgium (1894–1966)
Philipp Lenard – Hungary, Germany (1862–1947) Nobel laureate
John Lennard-Jones – U.K. (1894–1954)
John Leslie – U.K. (1766–1832)
Walter Lewin – Netherlands, United States (born 1936)
Martin Lewis Perl – United States (1927–2014)
Robert von Lieben – Austria-Hungary (1878–1913)
Alfred-Marie Liénard – France (1869–1958)
Evgeny Lifshitz – Soviet Union (1915–1985)
David Lindley – United States (born 1956)
John Linsley – United States (1925–2002)
Chris Lintott – U.K. (born 1980)
Gabriel Jonas Lippmann – France, Luxemburg (1845–1921) Nobel laureate
Antony Garrett Lisi – United States (born 1968)
Karl L. Littrow – Austria (1811–1877)
Seth Lloyd – United States (born 1960)
Oliver Lodge – U.K. (1851–1940)
Maurice Loewy – Austria, France (1833–1907)
Robert K. Logan – United States (born 1939)
Mikhail Lomonosov – Denisovka (1711–1765)
Alfred Lee Loomis – United States (1887–1975)
Ramón E. López – United States (born 1959)
Hendrik Lorentz – Netherlands (1853–1928) Nobel laureate
Ludvig Lorenz – Denmark (1829–1891)
Johann Josef Loschmidt – Austria (1821–1895)
Oleg Losev – Tver (1903–1942)
Archibald Low – U.K. (1888–1956)
Per-Olov Löwdin – Sweden (1916–2000)
Lucretius – Rome (98?–55BC)
Aleksandr Mikhailovich Lyapunov – Imperial Russia (1857–1918)
Joseph Lykken – United States (born 1957)

M 
Arthur B. McDonald – Canada (born 1943) Nobel laureate
Bedangadas Mohanty - India (born 1973)
Carolina Henriette Mac Gillavry – Netherlands (1904–1993)
Ernst Mach – Austria-Hungary (1838–1916)
Ray Mackintosh – U.K. 
Luciano Maiani – Italy, San Marino (born 1941)
Theodore Maiman – United States (1927–2007)
Arthur Maitland – U.K. (1925–1994)
Ettore Majorana – Italy (1906–1938 presumed dead)
Sudhansu Datta Majumdar – India (1915–1997)
Richard Makinson – Australia (1913–1979)
Juan Martín Maldacena – Argentina (born 1968)
Étienne-Louis Malus – France (1775–1812)
Leonid Isaakovich Mandelshtam – Imperial Russia, Soviet Union (1879–1944)
Franz Mandl – U.K. (1923–2009)
Charles Lambert Manneback – Belgium (1894–1975)
Peter Mansfield – U.K. (1933–2017)
Carlo Marangoni – Italy (1840–1925)
M. Cristina Marchetti – Italy, United States (born 1955)
Guglielmo Marconi – Italy (1874–1937) Nobel laureate
Henry Margenau – Germany, United States (1901–1977)
Nina Marković – Croatia, United States 
William Markowitz – United States (1907–1998)
Robert Marshak – United States (1916–1992)
Walter Marshall – U.K. (1932–1996)
Toshihide Maskawa – Japan (1940–2021) Nobel laureate
Harrie Massey – Australia (1908–1983)
John Cromwell Mather – United States (born 1946) Nobel laureate
James Clerk Maxwell – U.K. (1831–1879)
Brian May – U.K. (born 1947)
Maria Goeppert Mayer – Germany, United States (1906–1972)
Ronald E. McNair – United States (1950–1986)
Simon van der Meer – Netherlands (1925–2011) Nobel laureate
Lise Meitner – Austria (1878–1968)
Fulvio Melia – United States (born 1956)
Macedonio Melloni – Italy (1798–1854)
Adrian Melott – United States (born 1947)
Thomas Corwin Mendenhall – United States (1841–1924)
M. G. K. Menon – India (1928–2016)
David Merritt – United States
Albert Abraham Michelson – United States (1852–1931) Nobel laureate
Arthur Alan Middleton – United States 
Stanislav Mikheyev – Russia (1940–2011)
Robert Andrews Millikan – United States (1868–1953) Nobel laureate
Robert Mills- United States (1927-1999)
Arthur Milne – U.K. (1896–1950)
Shiraz Minwalla – India (born 1972)
Rabindra Nath Mohapatra – India, United States (born 1944)
Kathryn Moler – United States
Merritt Moore – United States (born 1988)
Tanya Monro – Australia (born 1973)
John J. Montgomery – United States (1858–1911)
Jagadeesh Moodera – India, United States (born 1950)
Henry Moseley – U.K. (1887–1915)
Rudolf Mössbauer – Germany (1929–2011) Nobel laureate
Nevill Mott – U.K. (1905–1996) Nobel laureate
Ben Roy Mottelson – Denmark, United States (1926–2022) Nobel laureate
Amédée Mouchez – Spain, France (1821–1892)
Ali Moustafa – Egypt (1898–1950)
José Enrique Moyal – Palestine, France, U.K., United States, Australia (1910–1998)
Karl Alexander Müller – Switzerland (1927–2023) Nobel laureate
Richard A. Muller – United States (born 1944)
Robert S. Mulliken – United States (1896–1986)
Pieter van Musschenbroek – Netherlands (1692–1762)

N 
Yoichiro Nambu – Japan, United States (1921–2015) Nobel laureate
Meenakshi Narain – United States (1964–2022)
Jayant Narlikar – India (born 1938)
Seth Neddermeyer – United States (1907–1988)
Louis Néel – France (1904–2000) Nobel laureate
Yuval Ne'eman – Israel (1925–2006)
Ann Nelson – United States (1958–2019)
John von Neumann – Austria-Hungary, United States (1903–1957)
Simon Newcomb – United States (1835–1909)
Sir Isaac Newton – England (1642–1727)
Edward P. Ney – United States (1920–1996)
Kendal Nezan – France, Kurdistan (born 1949)
Holger Bech Nielsen – Denmark (born 1941)
Leopoldo Nobili – Italy (1784–1835)
Emmy Noether – Germany (1882–1935)
Lothar Nordheim – Germany (1899–1985)
Gunnar Nordström – Finland (1881–1923)
Johann Gottlieb Nörremberg – Germany (1787–1862)
Konstantin Novoselov – Soviet Union, U.K. (born 1974) Nobel laureate
H. Pierre Noyes – United States (1923–2016)
John Nye – U.K. (1923–2019)

O 
Yuri Oganessian – Russia (born 1933)
Georg Ohm – Germany (1789–1854)
Hideo Ohno – Japan (born 1954)
Susumu Okubo – Japan, United States (1930–2015)
Sir Mark Oliphant – Australia (1901–2000)
David Olive – U.K. (1937–2012)
Zaira Ollano – Italy (1904–1997) 
Gerard K. O'Neill – United States (1927–1992)
Lars Onsager – Norway (1903–1976)
Robert Oppenheimer – United States (1904–1967)
Nicole Oresme – France (1325–1382)
Yuri Orlov – Soviet Union, United States (1924–2020)
Leonard Salomon Ornstein – Netherlands (1880–1941)
Egon Orowan – Austria-Hungary, United States (1901–1989)
Hans Christian Ørsted – Denmark (1777–1851)
Douglas Dean Osheroff – United States (born 1945) Nobel laureate
Silke Ospelkaus – Germany
Mikhail Vasilievich Ostrogradsky – Russia (1801–1862)

P 
Thanu Padmanabhan – India (1957–2021)
Heinz Pagels – United States (1939–1988)
Abraham Pais – Netherlands, United States (1918–2000)
Wolfgang K. H. Panofsky – Germany, United States (1919–2007)
Blaise Pascal – France (1623–1662)
John Pasta – United States (1918–1984)
Jogesh Pati – United States (born 1937)
Petr Paucek – United States
Stephen Paul – United States (1953–2012)
Wolfgang Paul – Germany (1913–1993) Nobel laureate
Wolfgang Pauli – Austria-Hungary (1900–1958) Nobel laureate
Cecilia_Payne-Gaposchkin -- United States (1900-1979) astronomer and astrophysicist
Ruby Payne-Scott – Australia (1912-1981)
George B. Pegram – United States (1876–1958)
Rudolf Peierls – Germany, U.K. (1907–1995)
Jean Peltier – France (1785–1845)
Roger Penrose, mathematician – U.K. (born 1931) Wolf laureate
Arno Allan Penzias, electrical engineer – U.S.A. (born 1933) Nobel laureate
Martin Lewis Perl – United States (1927–2014) Nobel laureate
Saul Perlmutter – United States (born 1959) Nobel laureate
Jean Baptiste Perrin – France (1870–1942) Nobel laureate
Konstantin Petrzhak – Soviet Union, Russia (1907–1998)
Bernhard Philberth – Germany (1927–2010)
William Daniel Phillips – United States (born 1948) Nobel laureate
Max Planck – Germany (1858–1947) Nobel laureate
Joseph Plateau – Belgium (1801–1883)
Milton S. Plesset – United States (1908–1991)
Ward Plummer – United States (1940–2020)
Boris Podolsky – Taganrog (1896–1966)
Henri Poincaré, mathematician – France (1854–1912)
Eric Poisson – Canada (born 1965)
Siméon Denis Poisson – France (1781–1840) mathematician
Balthasar van der Pol – Netherlands (1889–1959) electrical engineer
Joseph Polchinski – United States (1954–2018)
Hugh David Politzer – United States (born 1949) Nobel laureate
John Polkinghorne – U.K. (1930–2021)
Julianne Pollard-Larkin – United States
Alexander M. Polyakov – Russia, United States (born 1945)
Bruno Pontecorvo – Italy, Soviet Union (1913–1993)
Heraclides Ponticus – Greece (387–312 BC)
Heinz Pose – Germany (1905–1975)
Cecil Frank Powell – U.K. (1903–1969) Nobel laureate
John Henry Poynting – U.K. (1852–1914)
Ludwig Prandtl – Germany (1875–1953)
Willibald Peter Prasthofer – Austria (1917–1993)
Ilya Prigogine – Belgium (1917–2003)
Alexander Prokhorov – Soviet, Russian (1916–2002) Nobel laureate
William Prout – U.K. (1785–1850)
Luigi Puccianti – Italy (1875–1952)
Ivan Pulyuy – Ukraine (1845–1918)
Mihajlo Idvorski Pupin – Serbia, United States (1858–1935)
Edward Mills Purcell – United States (1912–1997) Nobel laureate

Q 
Xuesen Qian – China (1911-2009)
Helen Quinn – Australia, United States (born 1943)

R 
Raúl Rabadán – United States
Gabriele Rabel – Austria, United Kingdom (1880–1963)
Isidor Isaac Rabi – Austria, United States (1898–1988) Nobel laureate
Giulio Racah – Italian-Israeli (1909–1965)
James Rainwater – United States (1917–1986) Nobel laureate
Mark G. Raizen – New York City United States (born 1955)
Alladi Ramakrishnan – India (1923–2008)
Chandrasekhara Venkata Raman – India (1888–1970) Nobel laureate
Edward Ramberg – United States (1907–1995)
Carl Ramsauer – Germany (1879–1955)
Norman Foster Ramsey, Jr. – United States (1915–2011) Nobel laureate
Lisa Randall – United States (born 1962)
Riccardo Rattazzi – Italy (born 1964)
Lord Rayleigh – U.K. (1842–1919) Nobel laureate
René Antoine Ferchault de Réaumur – France (1683–1757)
Sidney Redner – Canada, United States (born 1951)
Martin John Rees – U.K. (born 1942)
Hubert Reeves – Canada (born 1932)
Tullio Regge – Italy (1931–2014)
Frederick Reines – United States (1918–1998) Nobel laureate
Louis Rendu – France (1789–1859)
Osborne Reynolds – U.K. (1842–1912)
Owen Willans Richardson – U.K. (1879–1959) Nobel laureate
Robert Coleman Richardson – United States (1937–2013) Nobel laureate
Burton Richter – United States (1931–2018) Nobel laureate
Floyd K. Richtmyer – United States (1881–1939)
Robert D. Richtmyer – (1910–2003)
Charlotte Riefenstahl – Germany (1899–1993)
Nikolaus Riehl – Germany (1901–1990)
Adam Riess – United States (born 1969) Nobel laureate
Karl-Heinrich Riewe – Germany
Walther Ritz – Switzerland (1878–1909)
Étienne-Gaspard Robert – Belgium (1763–1837)
Heinrich Rohrer – Switzerland (1933–2013) Nobel laureate
Joseph Romm – United States (born 1960)
Wilhelm Conrad Röntgen – Germany (1845–1923) Nobel laureate
Clemens C. J. Roothaan – Netherlands (1918–2019)
Nathan Rosen – United States, Israel (1909–1995)
Marshall Rosenbluth – United States (1927–2003)
Yasha Rosenfeld – Israel (1948–2002)
Carl-Gustav Arvid Rossby – Sweden, United States (1898–1957)
Bruno Rossi – Italy, United States (1905–1993)
Joseph Rotblat – Poland, U.K. (1908–2005)
Carlo Rovelli – Italy (born 1956)
Subrata Roy (scientist) – India, United States
Carlo Rubbia – Italy (born 1934) Nobel laureate
Vera Rubin – United States (1928–2016)
Serge Rudaz – Canada, United States (born 1954)
David Ruelle – Belgium, France (born 1935)
Ernst August Friedrich Ruska – Germany (1906–1988) Nobel laureate
Ernest Rutherford – New Zealand, U.K. (1871–1937)
Janne Rydberg – Sweden (1854–1919)
Martin Ryle – U.K. (1918–1984) Nobel laureate

S 
Mendel Sachs – United States (1927–2012)
Rainer K. Sachs – Germany and United States (1932- )
Robert G. Sachs – United States (1916–1999)
Carl Sagan – United States (1934–1996)
Georges-Louis le Sage – Switzerland (1724–1803)
Georges Sagnac – France (1869–1926)
Megh Nad Saha – Bengali India (1893–1956)
Shoichi Sakata – Japan (1911–1970)
Andrei Dmitrievich Sakharov – Soviet Union (1929–1989)
Oscar Sala – Brazil (1922–2010)
Abdus Salam – Pakistan (1926–1996) Nobel laureate
Edwin Ernest Salpeter – Austria, Australia, United States (1924–2008)
Anthony Ichiro Sanda – Japan, United States (born 1944)
Antonella De Santo – Italy, U.K.
Vikram Sarabhai – India (1919–1971)
Isidor Sauers – Austria (born 1948)
Félix Savart – France (1791–1841)
Brendan Scaife – Ireland (born 1928)
Martin Schadt – Switzerland (born 1938)
Arthur Leonard Schawlow – United States (1921–1999) Nobel laureate
Craige Schensted – United States
Joël Scherk – France (1946–1979)
Otto Scherzer – Germany (1909–1982)
Brian Schmidt – Australia, United States (born 1967) Nobel laureate
Alan Schoen – United States (born 1924) 
Walter H. Schottky – Germany (1886–1976)
Kees A. Schouhamer Immink – Netherlands (born 1946)
John Robert Schrieffer – United States (1931–2019) Nobel laureate
Erwin Schrödinger – Austria-Hungary (1887–1961) Nobel laureate
John Henry Schwarz – United States (born 1941)
Melvin Schwartz – United States (1932–2006) Nobel laureate
Karl Schwarzschild – German Empire (1876–1916)
Julian Schwinger – United States (1918–1994) Nobel laureate
Marlan Scully – United States (born 1939)
Dennis William Sciama – U.K. (1926–1999)
Bice Sechi-Zorn – Italy, United States (1928–1984)
Thomas Johann Seebeck – Estonia (1770–1831)
Raymond Seeger – United States (1906–1992)
Emilio G. Segre – Italy, United States (1905–1989) Nobel laureate
Nathan Seiberg – United States (born 1956)
Frederick Seitz – United States (1911–2008)
Nikolay Semyonov – Russia (1896–1986)
Ashoke Sen – India (born 1956)
Hiranmay Sen Gupta – Bangladesh (1934–2022)
Robert Serber – United States (1909–1997)
Roman U. Sexl – Austria (1939–1986)
Shen Kuo – China (1031–1095)
Mikhail Shifman – Russia, United States (born 1949)
Dmitry Shirkov – Russia (1928–2016)
William Shockley – United States (1910–1989) Nobel laureate
Boris Shraiman – United States (1956)
Lev Shubnikov – Russia, Netherlands, Ukraine (1901–1937)
Clifford Shull – United States (1915–2001) Nobel laureate
Kai Siegbahn – Sweden (1918–2007) Nobel laureate
Manne Siegbahn – Sweden (1886–1978) Nobel laureate
Ludwik Silberstein – Poland, Germany, Italy, United States, Canada (1872–1948)
Eva Silverstein – United States (born 1970)
John Alexander Simpson – United States (1916–2000)
Willem de Sitter – Netherlands (1872–1934)
Uri Sivan – Israel (born 1955)
Tamitha Skov - space weather physicist, researcher and public speaker
G. V. Skrotskii – Russia (1915–1992)
Francis G. Slack – United States (1897–1985)
John C. Slater – United States (1900–1976)
Louis Slotin – United States (1910–1946)
Alexei Yuryevich Smirnov – Russia, Italy (born 1951)
George E. Smith – United States (born 1930) Nobel laureate
Lee Smolin – United States (born 1955)
Marian Smoluchowski – Poland (1872–1917)
George Smoot – United States (born 1945) Nobel laureate
Willebrord Snell – Netherlands (1580–1626)
Arsenij Sokolov – Russia (1910–1986)
Arnold Sommerfeld – Germany (1868–1951)
Bent Sørensen – Denmark (born 1941)
Rafael Sorkin – United States (born 1945)
Nicola Spaldin – United Kingdom (born 1969)
Maria Spiropulu – Greece (born 1970)
Henry Stapp – United States (born 1928)
Johannes Stark – Germany (1874–1957) Nobel laureate
Max Steenbeck – (1901–1981)
Joseph Stefan – Austria-Hungary, Slovenia (1835–1893)
Jack Steinberger – Germany, United States (1921–2020) Nobel laureate
Paul J. Steinhardt  – United States (born 1952)
Carl August Steinheil – Germany (1801–1870)
George Sterman – United States (born 1946)
Otto Stern – Germany (1888–1969) Nobel laureate
Simon Stevin – Belgium, Netherlands (1548–1620)
Thomas H. Stix – United States (1924–2001)
George Gabriel Stokes – Ireland, U.K. (1819–1903)
Aleksandr Stoletov – Russia (1839–1896)
Donna Strickland  – Canada (born 1959) Nobel laureate
Horst Ludwig Störmer – Germany (born 1949) Nobel laureate
Leonard Strachan - United States, astrophysicist
Julius Adams Stratton - United States
Andrew Strominger – United States (born 1955)
Audrey Stuckes – U.K. (1923–2006)
Ernst Stueckelberg – Switzerland (1905–1984)
George Sudarshan – India, United States (1931–2018)
Rashid Sunyaev – USSR (born 1943)
Oleg Sushkov – USSR, Australia (born 1950)
Leonard Susskind – United States (born 1940)
Joseph Swan – U.K. (1828–1914)
Jean Henri van Swinden – Netherlands (1746–1823)
Bertha Swirles – U.K. (1903–1999)
Leo Szilard – Austria-Hungary, United States (1898–1964)

T 
Igor Yevgenyevich Tamm – Imperial Russia, Soviet Union (1895–1971) Nobel laureate
Abraham H. Taub – United States (1911–1999)
Martin Tajmar – Austria (born 1974)
Geoffrey Ingram Taylor – U.K. (1886–1975)
Joseph Hooton Taylor, Jr. – United States (born 1941) Nobel laureate
Richard Edward Taylor – United States (1929–2018) Nobel laureate
Max Tegmark – Sweden, United States (born 1967)
Valentine Telegdi – Hungary, United States (1922–2006) Wolf laureate
Edward Teller – Austria-Hungary, United States (1908–2003)
Igor Ternov – Russia (1921–1996)
George Paget Thomson – U.K. (1892–1975) Nobel laureate
J. J. Thomson – U.K. (1856–1940) Nobel laureate
William Thomson (Lord Kelvin) – Ireland, U.K. (1824–1907)
Charles Thorn – United States (born 1946)
Kip Stephen Thorne – United States (born 1940)
Peter Adolf Thiessen – Germany (1899–1990)
Samuel Chao Chung Ting – United States (born 1936) Nobel laureate
Frank J. Tipler – United States (born 1947)
Ernest William Titterton – U.K., Australia (1916–1990)
Yoshinori Tokura – Japan (born 1954)
Samuel Tolansky – U.K. (1907–1973)
Sin-Itiro Tomonaga – Japan (1906–1979) Nobel laureate
Lewi Tonks – United States (1897–1971)
Akira Tonomura – Japan (1942–2012)
Evangelista Torricelli – Italy (1608–1647)
Yoji Totsuka – Japan (1942–2008)
Bruno Touschek – Italy (1921–1978)
Charles Townes – United States (1915–2015) Nobel laureate
John Townsend – U.K. (1868–1957)
Johann Georg Tralles – Germany (1763–1822)
Sam Treiman – United States (1925–1999)
Daniel Chee Tsui – China, United States (born 1939) Nobel laureate
Vipin Kumar Tripathi – India (born 1948)
John J. Turin – United States (1913–1973)
Neil Turok – South Africa (born 1958)
Victor Twersky – United States (1923–1998)
Sergei Tyablikov – Russia (1921–1968)
John Tyndall – U.K. (1820–1893)
Neil deGrasse Tyson – United States (born 1958)

U 
George Eugene Uhlenbeck – Netherlands, United States (1900–1988)
Stanislaw Ulam – Poland, United States (1909–1984)
Nikolay Umov – Russia (1846–1915)
Juris Upatnieks – Latvia, United States (born 1936)

V 
Cumrun Vafa – Iran, United States (born 1960)
Oriol Valls –  (born 1947 in Barcelona, Spain), university physics professor
Léon Van Hove – Belgium (1924–1990)
Sergei Vavilov – Soviet Union (1891–1951)
Vlatko Vedral – United Kingdom, Serbia (born 1971)
Evgeny Velikhov – Russia (born 1935)
Martinus J. G. Veltman – Netherlands, United States (1931–2021) Nobel laureate
Gabriele Veneziano – Italy (born 1942)
Giovanni Battista Venturi – Italy (1746–1822)
Émile Verdet – France (1824–1866)
Erik Verlinde – Netherlands (1962)
Herman Verlinde – Netherlands (1962)
Leonardo da Vinci - Italy (1452-1519) 
Jean-Pierre Vigier – France (1920–2004)
Gaetano Vignola – Italy 
Anatoly Vlasov – Russia (1908–1975)
John Hasbrouck van Vleck – United States (1899–1980) Nobel laureate
Woldemar Voigt – Germany (1850–1919)
Burchard de Volder – Netherlands (1643–1709)
Max Volmer – Germany (1885–1965)
Alessandro Volta – Italy (1745–1827)
Wernher Von Braun, aerospace engineer – Germany (1912–1977)

W 
Johannes Diderik van der Waals – Netherlands (1837–1923) Nobel laureate
James Wait – Canada (1924–1998)
Ludwig Waldmann – Germany (1913–1980)
Alan Walsh – U.K., Australia (1916–1988)
Ernest Walton – Ireland (1903–1995) Nobel laureate
Dezhao Wang – China (1905–1998)
Enge Wang – China (born 1957)
Huanyu Wang – China (1954—2018)
Kan-Chang Wang – China (1907–1998)
Pu (Paul) Wang – China (1902–1969)
Zhuxi Wang – China (1911–1983)
Aaldert Wapstra – Netherlands (1923–2006)
John Clive Ward – England, Australia (1924–2000)
Gleb Wataghin – Ukraine, Italy, Brazil (1896–1986)
John James Waterston – U.K. (1811–1883)
Alan Andrew Watson – U.K. (born 1938)
James Watt – U.K. (1736–1819)
Denis Weaire – Ireland (born 1942)
Colin Webb – U.K. (born 1937)
Wilhelm Weber – Germany (1804–1891)
Katherine Weimer – United States (1919–2000)
Alvin Weinberg – United States (1915–2006)
Steven Weinberg – United States (1933–2021) Nobel laureate
Rainer Weiss – United States (born 1932) Nobel laureate
Victor Frederick Weisskopf – Austria, United States (1908–2002)
Carl Friedrich von Weizsäcker – Germany (1912–2007)
Heinrich Welker – Germany (1912–1981)
Gregor Wentzel – Germany (1898–1978)
Paul Werbos – United States (born 1947)
Siebren van der Werf – Netherlands (born 1942)
Peter Westervelt – United States (1919–2015)
Hermann Weyl – Germany (1885–1955)
Christof Wetterich – Germany (born 1952)
John Archibald Wheeler – United States (1911–2008)
Gian-Carlo Wick – Italy (1909–1992)
Emil Wiechert – Prussia (1861–1928)
Carl Wieman – United States (born 1951) Nobel laureate
Wilhelm Wien – Germany (1864–1928) Nobel laureate
Arthur Wightman – United States (1922–2013)
Eugene Wigner – Austria-Hungary, United States (1902–1993) Nobel laureate
Frank Wilczek – United States (born 1951) Nobel laureate
Charles Thomson Rees Wilson – U.K. (1869–1959) Nobel laureate
Christine Wilson (scientist) – Canadian-American physicist and astronomer
Kenneth Geddes Wilson – United States (1936–2013) Nobel laureate
Robert R. Wilson – United States (1914–2000) Nobel laureate
Robert Woodrow Wilson – United States (born 1936)
John R. Winckler – United States (1918–2001)
David J. Wineland – United States (born 1944) Nobel laureate
Karl Wirtz – Germany (1910–1994)
Mark B. Wise – Canada, United States (born 1953)
Edward Witten – United States (born 1951)
Emil Wolf – Czechoslovakia, United States (1922–2018)
Fred Alan Wolf – United States (born 1934)
Lincoln Wolfenstein – United States (1923–2015)
Stephen Wolfram – U.K. (born 1959)
Ewald Wollny – Germany (1846–1901)
Michael Woolfson – U.K. (1927–2019)
Chien-Shiung Wu – United States (1912–1997)
Sau Lan Wu – United States (born Early 1940s)
Tai Tsun Wu - United States (born 1933)

X 
 Basilis C. Xanthopoulos – Greece (1951–1990)

Y 
Rosalyn Yalow – United States (1921–2011)
Chen Ning Yang – China (born 1922) Nobel laureate
Félix Ynduráin – Spain (born 1946)
Francisco José Ynduráin – Spain (1940–2008)
Kenneth Young – United States, China (born 1947)
Thomas Young – UK (1773–1829)
Hideki Yukawa – Japan (1907–1981) Nobel laureate

Z 
Jan Zaanen – Netherlands (born 1957)
Daniel Zajfman – Israel (born 1959)
Anthony Zee – United States (born 1945)
Pieter Zeeman – Netherlands (1865–1943) Nobel laureate
Ludwig Zehnder – Switzerland (1854–1949)
Anton Zeilinger – Austria (born 1945)
Yakov Borisovich Zel'dovich – Russia (1914–1987)
John Zeleny – United States (1872–1951)
Frits Zernike – Netherlands (1888–1960) Nobel laureate
Antonino Zichichi – Italy (born 1929)
Hans Ziegler – Switzerland, United States (1910–1985)
Karl Zimmer – Germany (1911–1988)
Georges Zissis – Greece (born 1964)
Peter Zoller – Austria (born 1952)
Dmitry Zubarev – Russia (1917–1992)
Bruno Zumino – Italy (1923–2014)
Wojciech H. Zurek – Poland, United States (born 1951)
Robert Zwanzig – United States (1928–2014)
George Zweig – United States (born 1937)
Barton Zwiebach – United States (born 1954)
Samik Hazra - India (born 1984)

External links
Pictures of some physicists (mostly 20th-century American) are collected in the Emilio Segrè Visual Archives and A Picture Gallery of Famous Physicists
20th-century women in physics in the Contributions of 20th Century Women to Physics archive

References

 
Physicists
 List of Physicist